The Swell Season is a folk rock duo formed by Irish musician Glen Hansard and Czech singer and pianist Markéta Irglová. "The Swell Season" name is derived from Hansard's favourite novel by Josef Škvorecký from 1975 bearing the same title. Their debut album, released in 2006, carried the same name.

The duo rose to prominence following the success of the 2007 film Once, directed by John Carney, in which the pair starred depicting a dramatised version of their own musical pairing. Their song "Falling Slowly" from the film took the Oscar for Best Song at the 80th Academy Awards. They increasingly referred to themselves as "The Swell Season" in promotion of their performances until it became the formal name of their collaboration in 2008. (They still used their separate names when they contributed their cover of Bob Dylan's "You Ain't Goin' Nowhere" to the 2007 soundtrack of I'm Not There.)

From 2007 through 2010, a documentary film was made about Irglova and Hansard called The Swell Season. The documentary premiered at the Tribeca Film Festival in June 2011 to positive reviews.

History 
The self-titled first album came about after Hansard and Irglová were approached by the Czech film director Jan Hřebejk while touring in the Czech Republic, and were asked by him to record songs for his upcoming film Beauty in Trouble. It was the first album that Hansard, the singer for The Frames, had released independent of his band.

The tracks from the debut album "Falling Slowly" and "When Your Mind's Made Up" also appeared on The Frames' album The Cost, and "Falling Slowly", "When Your Mind's Made Up", "Lies" and "Leave" from the album also were on the Once soundtrack.

A follow up album, Strict Joy, was released on 27 October 2009 in the United States. Three singles from the album have been released: "In These Arms", "Low Rising", and "Feeling the Pull".

Spin Magazine'''s review of Strict Joy gave the album 4 out of 5 stars. It stated "If Glen Hansard's and Markéta Irglová's roles in the hit Irish indie film Once unintentionally wove the tale of their real-life falling in love, their second album as the Swell Season weaves the story of their falling out of it."

In August 2010, The Swell Season covered Neutral Milk Hotel's "Two-Headed Boy" for The A.V. Club.

At a concert of 19 August 2010 at the Mountain Winery, Saratoga, a concert attendee leapt to his death from the roof of the venue onto the stage. The death was deemed a suicide. The band provided and paid for group counselling sessions for concert attendees who witnessed the event.

In a December 2011 interview in the Huffington Post with Irglová, she revealed that the Swell Season would probably release a third album when Hansard finishes with other commitments, but no third album was ever made by the duo.

Hansard and Irglová parodied their roles from Once in The Simpsons 2009 episode, "In the Name of the Grandfather".

On 10 and 11 January 2015, to celebrate re-releasing Once'' in South Korea, The Swell Season reunited for two-night concert at Sejong Center.

In 2019, Hansard said there were currently no plans for the duo to go on tour again.

In 2021, Hansard confirmed to Variety that The Swell Season would be playing six dates in the U.S in 2022. Fifteen further dates were announced for 2023.

Discography

Albums

Singles
 "Falling Slowly" (2007)
 "When Your Mind's Made Up" (2007)
 "Falling Slowly" (2008, re-release, No. 61 Billboard Hot 100)
 "Into the Mystic" (2008, part of "Before the Goldrush", the Teach For America Covers Project)
 "In These Arms" (2009)
 "Low Rising" (2009)
 "Feeling the Pull" (2010)

References

External links
 Official web site

Irish folk musical groups
Musical groups established in 2005
Musical groups from Dublin (city)
Irish musical duos
Anti- (record label) artists